Camptodactyly-taurinuria syndrome, also known as familial streblodactyly with amino aciduria is a very rare autosomal dominant genetic disorder which consists of hand camptodactyly (usually affecting the pinky finger) and high levels of taurine in urine due to over-excretion of it. 17 affected people from 4 families across the world have been reported in medical literature. No new cases have been described since 1966. It is believed to be autosomal dominant.

References 

Rare genetic syndromes
Genetic diseases and disorders